Brianchon may refer to:
 Charles Julien Brianchon, French mathematician
 Maurice Brianchon, (1899–1979), French artist 
 Brianchon, a lunar crater